Farrar is an unincorporated community in Edgecombe County, North Carolina, United States. The town was probably named for Owen Cicero Farrar, a leading member of the local Baptist church and businessman who ran the general store, the Hotel Farrar, and founder of the Tarboro Cotton Factory constructed in 1888 in nearby Tarboro.

References

Unincorporated communities in Edgecombe County, North Carolina
Unincorporated communities in North Carolina